Emteria.OS is an Android based operating system (OS). The application of the OS is mainly purposed for industrial applications such as internet of things, digital signage, vending machines, point of sale or smart city.

Introduction 
The emteria.OS is a commercial operating system developed by German company emteria GmbH. It extends the Android Open Source Project (AOSP) platform with additional applications and services with the focus on industrial use cases.

Based on AOSP, emteria.OS is fully compatible with existing applications and components for Android. Also, as an advantage of Android, emteria.OS brings improvements in uniform UI and a rich framework for app development into different industrial devices.

The platform can be used for reliable industrial applications and products such as point-of-sales systems, smart homes, infotainment installations, as well as for Human Machine Interfaces (HMI), and ticketing machines.

Market goals 
Emteria.OS started with Android 7 for Raspberry Pi 3B/3B+, which is a popular maker board and used in industry for proof of concept (PoC) and prototyping. Later a version for Raspberry Pi 4 Model B, Raspberry Pi 400 Personal Computer Kit, and Compute Module 4 was released to support custom RPi-based devices. The latest version of emteria.OS for the Raspberry Pi 4B is based on the Android 13 version Tiramisu recently released by Google. The list of supported platforms has been expanded to devices based on Qualcomm and NXP chipsets provides a reliable operating system for production.

Features 

The product aims at increasing the adaptability of Android and simplifying its customization.  It improves Android features in order to be hardware-independent OS and brings simplicity to the configuration and management of devices. Emteria.OS includes Board Support Packages (BSP) for different hardware platforms. For simplicity and efficiency BSP for the corresponding hardware platform is automatically downloaded and installed during the installation process along with the Android system image.

The emteria.OS adds new features to standard Android, in order to make the operation and management for product manufacturers easier:

 App management: it provides an infrastructure for adding private application stores, which companies can use to bring their own apps onto custom hardware, like Google’s Play Store and Apple's App Store 
 Simplified customization and provisioning: system settings can be changed via provided web portal, while certain changes like resolution adaptation or driver inclusion in standard Android would require a recompilation of the whole OS. In addition, it allows users to preinstall their settings and applications on many devices instead of installing plain Android and configuring everything manually on each single device. Besides, as the Android image usually consists of several partitions (like BSP, data, system), a provided emteria installer simplifies the installation processes. While consumer devices include a bootloader with Fastboot support, flashing industrial hardware typically means mounting its internal (eMMC) or external (SD cards) memory directly and creating required partitions
 Device and configuration management: clients can monitor their devices remotely and add, start, stop, or delete an application or change system settings on the fly 
 Security updates: unlike standard Android, security updates are installed automatically in emteria.OS which helps the producer to keep the device more secure
 Autostart apps: it allows the user to activate or disable the apps to automate starting after booting the device 
 Kiosk mode: it allows the system to run only certain apps for the users which increases the security by avoiding unnecessary user access to crucial system files and settings 
 More extra features are built-in connectivity with a VNC and SSH server

Supported hardware 
A list of supported devices is given in the following table:

See also 

 List of custom Android firmware

References

External links 

 

Android forks